Tracie Laymon is an American screenwriter, producer and film director. Laymon was raised in Houston, Texas, and studied film at the University of Texas at Austin. She began her film career with work in the Texas area, and several of her music videos and short films were recognized with film festival awards. She served in film production capacities in multiple movies, including Matchstick Men in 2003 and The Alamo in 2004. Laymon moved to California in 2005, and continued film production work there, serving as production assistant on films The Ringer in 2005 and Blades of Glory in 2007. Her short film Inside premiered in 2009 at the Milan International Film Festival in Milan, Italy, and won the award in "Best Short Film" from the Women's Image Network.  She also directed the first ever half-hour comedy for the internet entitled "Goodnight Burbank", which premiered on Hulu.com in April 2011 and was personally acquired by Mark Cuban that same day.  The shows then aired on Cuban's HDNet in the fall of 2011.  Her most recent short film "A Hidden Agender" premiered at the Dallas International Film Festival and received the Jury Award for Best Dark Comedy at the Houston International Film Festival (also known as Worldfest Houston) in 2012.  Laymon was also named to the Independent Film Channel's list of emerging "Icons" and "Film Innovators".  She is currently in development of her first feature film, which she also wrote.  The original screenplay received the Jury Award for Best Screenplay at the LA Comedy Festival in December 2013.  Laymon is in development of this feature film and plans to direct it in Texas in 2017.

Career

Texas
Tracie Laymon was born and grew up in Houston, Texas. Laymon pursued a curriculum of film studies at the University of Texas at Austin. Laymon worked as an office intern on the production of the 2001 film Waking Life. She worked as a set production assistant on the 2003 film Matchstick Men. Laymon was assistant director on the music video Frijolero by the Mexico-based musical group Molotov, which received a Latin Grammy Award in 2003. She was employed as special effects office administrator on the 2004 film The Alamo, and directed the 2004 film Attention Deficit. In 2004, she received recognition for her work on the music video better? for the group 54 Seconds; garnering the SXSW Jury Award in 2004. Laymon spent some time working in Austin, Texas, making short films. Laymon moved to California from Texas in 2005. She worked on the production staff of The Real World: Austin.

California
Laymon was a production assistant on the 2005 film The Ringer, and the 2007 film Blades of Glory. She worked on production as office manager for the 2008 film U2 3D. In 2009 she worked as a filmmaker based in Los Angeles, California. In May 2009, Laymon's music video Falling From Mars which included musician Alyssa Campbell won the Music Video award at the on Location: Memphis International Film Fest in Memphis, Tennessee. Laymon directed the short movie Inside which was released in 2009; it was produced along with gastroenterologist Dr. Louis Wilson and his film production company called Merit Pictures. Inside had its movie premiere at the Milan International Film Festival in May 2009 in Milan, Italy. Inside was nominated in 2009 at the Milan International Film Festival Awards as "Best Short Film". Laymon was selected for inclusion by the Independent Film Channel as a part of the "IFC Icons", a group of featured artists on the IFC website in film and video.

Filmography

Awards and nominations

See also
List of film and television directors
Music video director

References

Further reading

External links

Year of birth missing (living people)
Living people
Screenwriters from Texas
Artists from Texas
Actresses from Houston
American women film directors
Moody College of Communication alumni
Film directors from Texas
21st-century American women